Onchidoris hystricina is a species of sea slug, a dorid nudibranch, a shell-less marine gastropod mollusc in the family Onchidorididae.

Distribution
This species was described from a specimen collected by William Healey Dall in Alaska at Kyska Island, Aleutian Islands. It is considered by some authors to be a synonym of Onchidoris muricata. The name was used incorrectly for the species Diaphorodoris lirulatocauda on the Pacific coast of the US and Canada.

References

Onchidorididae
Gastropods described in 1879